Mario Kern (born 16 August 1969) is a German retired professional football defender who played for Dynamo Dresden, 1. FC Kaiserslautern and VfB Leipzig.

He was a part of the East German squad at the 1989 FIFA World Youth Championship, playing all three matches.

References

External links
 
 

1969 births
Living people
German footballers
East German footballers
Association football defenders
Germany under-21 international footballers
Dynamo Dresden players
1. FC Kaiserslautern players
1. FC Lokomotive Leipzig players
Bundesliga players
2. Bundesliga players
DDR-Oberliga players
20th-century German people